Vale do Aço Regional Airport , formerly known as Usiminas Airport, is the airport serving Ipatinga, Brazil, located in the adjoining municipality of Santana do Paraíso.

It is managed by contract by Infraero.

History
Formerly owned and managed by the steel manufacturer Usiminas, in 2012 the administration started to be conducted in partnership with Socicam. However, in March 2016 the concessionary became temporarily the sole administrator. Later, the administration returned to Infraero.

As result of structural problems on the runway, on February 20, 2019, ANAC suspended all operations at Usiminas Airport until the concessionary solves the problems.

Airlines and destinations

Access

See also

List of airports in Brazil

References

External links

Airports in Minas Gerais